Heeyy EP is an EP by the Southern hip hop duo GRITS.

Track listing
 Heeyy (Digital Version)
 They All Fall Down (Redneck Remix)
 Ima Showem (DJ Maj Remix) (Single)

2006 EPs
GRITS albums
Gotee Records EPs
Christian hip hop EPs